Thibaut Rausin (born 3 May 1993) is a Belgian footballer who currently plays for Lierse Kempenzonen in the Belgian First Division B as a goalkeeper.

External links

1993 births
Living people
Belgian footballers
Association football goalkeepers
A.F.C. Tubize players
Challenger Pro League players
Lierse Kempenzonen players